Torfinn Bjarkøy (27 July 1952 – 7 October 2022) was a Norwegian civil servant.

He was born in Narvik. He served as the Norwegian Consumer Ombudsman from 1995 to 2000, having previously worked as a sub-director for the ombudsman from 1989. He died in Bærum in October 2022.

References

1952 births
2022 deaths
People from Narvik
Directors of government agencies of Norway
Ombudsmen in Norway